Dante Di Benedetti (born October 28, 1916 in Genzano di Roma) is a former Italian professional football player.

He played for 8 seasons (143 games, 52 goals) in the Serie A for A.S. Roma, ACF Fiorentina, A.S. Bari and S.S.C. Napoli.

He was among the top 10 scorers of the 1940/41 Serie A season.

1916 births
Year of death missing
People from Genzano di Roma
Italian footballers
Serie A players
Serie B players
A.S. Roma players
ACF Fiorentina players
S.S.D. Lucchese 1905 players
Pisa S.C. players
S.S.C. Bari players
S.S.C. Napoli players
Association football forwards
Footballers from Lazio
Sportspeople from the Metropolitan City of Rome Capital